Cercosaura nigroventris is a species of lizard in the family Gymnophthalmidae. It is endemic to Venezuela.

References

Cercosaura
Reptiles of Venezuela
Endemic fauna of Venezuela
Reptiles described in 1999
Taxa named by Stefan Jan Filip Gorzula
Taxa named by Josefa Celsa Señaris